A counter-celebration or counter-observance or alternative commemoration can be a form of protest of a holiday's commemoration by challenging its dominant narrative with an alternative event, often representing a social cause such as indigenous rights, and involving symbolic subversion in the style of culture jamming.

Counter-celebrations
Australia Day: Day of Mourning and Invasion Day or Survival Day
Columbus Day: Indigenous Peoples' Day
Thanksgiving: National Day of Mourning and Unthanksgiving Day
International Workers Day: Loyalty Day

References

Protest tactics
Secular holidays